Santo Tomas, officially the Municipality of Santo Tomas, is a 1st class municipality in the province of Davao del Norte, Philippines. According to the 2020 census, it has a population of 128,667 people.

Etymology
Santo Tomas was so named after Saint Thomas, the patron saint of Danao which is the hometown of then Governor of undivided Davao Province Vicente Duterte, father of the 16th Philippine president Rodrigo Duterte.

History
What is now Santo Tomas, initially called Tibal-og, was once part of the jurisdiction of nearby town of Kapalong. Before the 1950s. the place used to be a lush forest inhabited by the indigenous Ata-Manobo people.

According to the town's pioneering residents, the area of what is now Kapalong (in which what is now Santo Tomas was still part of) and Panabo City were planted for abaca during the pre-war years.

Santo Tomas was established as a municipality through Executive Order No. 352, issued by President Carlos P. Garcia on August 14, 1959. It consists of Barrio Tibal-og, designated as the seat of government, and "other barrios or sitios" of Kapalong, and four barrios of Panabo, all then part of the old Davao province.

Feliciano P. Ganade served as the first elected mayor of Santo Tomas after briefly governing the city of Kapalong.

From then on, it continued to grow and prosper, even as it went several successions of mayoralty governance throughout its history.

Geography
Santo Tomas is located on the island of Mindanao, and it is in the province's second political district.  It is bounded in the north by the Municipalities of Kapalong and Talaingod, in the east by the Municipality of Asuncion, in the west by Davao City, and in the south by the Municipality of Braulio E. Dujali.

Climate
Rainfall in Santo Tomas is evenly distributed throughout the year.  Being a nearly typhoon-free municipality, the production of high-value crops is favorable all year round and makes a profitable investment.

Barangays
Santo Tomas is politically subdivided into 19 barangays.

Demographics

Santo Tomas is home to a diverse culture inter-mingling with Mandaya and Ata-Manobo. The people are predominantly Cebuano.

Economy

Significant to the economic development of Santo Tomas is a number of multi-national corporations and cooperatives engaged in banana based commercial production successfully operating in the municipality.  Rice production also contributes to the economic development of the municipality. SantoTomas was part of the lists for the top 15 richest municipality in Davao Region which was listed as the second place.

Transportation

Santo Tomas sits astride the Davao del Norte Provincial Circumferential Road. It is more or less  or about an hour ride from Tagum City by any land vehicle, and the town offers a wide choice of public utility jeepneys via Kinamayan route or bus liners via Carmen route.

Santo Tomas is accessible by land through any type of vehicle.  There are tricycle units serving the different routes within the municipality. Most tricycles are color-coded red, with a capacity of 6 passengers per tricycle.

Education
Santo Tomas have several public and private institutions.

Elementary schools:

 Apitong Elementary School (Public)
 Balagunan Elementary School (Public)
 Balisong Elementary School (Public)
 Bobongon Elementary School (Public)
 Casig-ang Elementary School (Public)
 Davao Winchester Colleges Inc. (Private)
 Esperanza Elementary School (Public)
 Holy Infant School of Santo Tomas, Inc. (Private)
 Jireh School of Tomorrow (Private)
 Jesus Lumain Elementary School (Public)
 Kimamon Elementary School (Public)
 Kinamayan Integrated School (Public)
 La Libertad Elementary School (Public)
 Lunga-og Elementary School (Public)
 Magwawa Elementary School (Public)
 Marsman Elementary School (Public)
 Maryknoll High School of Santo Tomas (Private)
 Mustard Seed Christian School, Inc. (Private)
 Nafco Central Elementary School (Public)
 New Katipunan Elementary School (Public)
 New Visayas Elementary School (Public)
 Pantaron Elementary School (Public)
 Philippine Baptist Christian College of Mindanao, Inc. (Private)
 Salvacion Elementary School (Public)
 San Isidro Elementary School (Public)
 San Jose Elementary School (Public)
 San Vincenzo Learning Center (Private)
 Santo Tomas Central Elementary School - Sped Center (Public)
 Talomo Elementary School (Public)
 Talos Elementary School (Public)
 Temple Christian School, Inc. (Private)
 Tulalian Elementary School (Public)

High schools:

 Balagunan National High School (Public)
 Davao Winchester Colleges Inc. (Private)
 Kimamon National High School (Public)
 La Libertad National High School (Public)
 Marsman National High School (Public)
 Maryknoll High School of Santo Tomas (Private)
 Mustard Seed Christian School, Inc. (Private)
 Philippine Baptist Christian College of Mindanao, Inc. (Private)
 Salvacion National High School (Public)
 Santo Tomas National High School (Public)
 Temple Christian School Inc. (Private)
 Tulalian National High School (Public)

Tertiary education:
 Bukidnon State University (discontinued)
 Davao Winchester Colleges Inc. (Private)
 University of Southeastern Philippines
 Santo Tomas College of Agriculture Science and Technology (STCAST)

Technical/vocational schools:
ABA Technical School of Santo Tomas, Inc.
 Davao Winchester Colleges Inc. (Private)

Culture
Araw ng Santo Tomas (lit. Day of Santo Tomas) is a celebration held every 14 August annually. Events include drum and lyre competitions; parades, fireworks display, and many more.

Gallery

References

External links

   Santo Tomas Profile at the DTI Cities and Municipalities Competitive Index
 [ Philippine Standard Geographic Code]
 Philippine Census Information
 Local Governance
 Performance Management System

Municipalities of Davao del Norte
Establishments by Philippine executive order